Several high schools are known as Highland Park High School including:

Highland Park Continuation in Los Angeles
Highland Park High School (Highland Park, Illinois) in Highland Park, Illinois
Highland Park High School (Topeka, Kansas) in Topeka, Kansas
Highland Park High School (Minnesota) in Saint Paul, Minnesota
Highland Park Community High School (Highland Park, Michigan) in Highland Park, Michigan
Highland Park High School (New Jersey) in Highland Park, New Jersey
Highland Park Independent School District (Potter County, Texas) in Amarillo, Texas
Highland Park High School (University Park, Texas) in University Park, Texas